Lila Karp (1933 – September 15, 2008) was an American feminist author, teacher, activist, and psychotherapist. She is best known for her 1969 novel The Queen Is in the Garbage, and is profiled in the book Feminists Who Changed America, 1963-1975. Karp spent a decade living in London, where she wrote The Queen Is in the Garbage, before moving to New York City in the late 1960s. She was among the second-wave feminists in New York in the 1960s and was a member of The Feminists. This group included such notables as Kate Millet, Flo Kennedy, Ti-Grace Atkinson, and Margo Jefferson. Karp was featured in the 1977 documentary Some American Feminists.

Karp played a vital role in pioneering the field of Women's Studies at Princeton University, where she served as the director of the University Women's Center. She delivered a paper on the subject entitled "Women's Studies: Fear and Loathing in the Ivy League" at the National Women's Studies Association Meeting in 1979. She was appointed the co-director of The Institute for the Study of Women and Men at the University of Southern California in 1991.

References 

Karp, Lila. The Queen is in the Garbage.  Feminist Press at CUNY, 2007. 
Love, Barbara J. Feminists Who Changed America, 1963-1975. University of Illinois Press, 2006.

External links 
 "The Queen is in the Garbage" The Feminist Press.
 Some American Feminists

1933 births
2008 deaths
American activists
American feminist writers
The Feminists members
People from London
People from New York City
Women's studies academics
Date of birth missing
Place of birth missing
Place of death missing